Central Ammunition Depot may refer to:

India
 CAD, Pulgaon, Wardha district, Maharashtra

United Kingdom
 CAD Bramley Camp, Hampshire
CAD Kineton, Warwickshire
 CAD Longtown, Cumbria
CAD Monkton Farleigh, Wiltshire, also known as CAD Corsham
 CAD Nesscliffe, Shropshire